This is a list of Ethiopian and Eritrean dishes and foods. Ethiopians and Eritreans eat exclusively with their right hands, using pieces of injera to pick up bites of entrées and side dishes. Utensils are rarely used with Ethiopian and Eritrean cuisine.

Ethiopian and Eritrean dishes and foods

 Dabo kolo – snack and finger food consisting of small pieces of baked bread
 Ensete – an economically important food crop in Ethiopia and Eritrea
  Teff – a grain widely cultivated and used in Eritrea and Ethiopia, where it is used to make injera or tayta. Teff accounts for about a quarter of total cereal production in Ethiopia.
 Fir-fir – an Ethiopian and Eritrean food typically served for breakfast.
 Ful medames – an Egyptian dish of cooked and mashed fava beans served with vegetable oil, cumin and optionally with chopped parsley, onion, garlic, and lemon juice, it is also a popular meal in Ethiopia, Eritrea and other countries.
 Ga'at or genfo – a stiff porridge
 Gored gored – a raw beef dish
 Guizotia abyssinica – an erect, stout, branched annual herb, grown for its edible oil and seed.
 Himbasha
 Injera – a spongy, slightly sour flatbread regularly served with other dishes.
 Kitfo
 Niter kibbeh – seasoned clarified butter used in Ethiopian and Eritrean cooking.
 Rhamnus prinoides
 Samosa (also sambusa) 
 Shahan ful
 Shiro – a stew with primary ingredients of powdered chickpeas or broad bean meal
 Tibs - cubes of beef in wat
 Tihlo - barley flour kneaded into soft balls and served with meat stew with berbere, Habesha spice, onions, tomato paste, water and salt
 Wat – stew that may be prepared with chicken, beef, lamb, a variety of vegetables, spice mixtures such as berbere, and niter kibbeh. Wat is traditionally eaten with injera.

Spices
 Aframomum corrorima – The spice known as korarima, Ethiopian cardamom, or false cardamom is obtained from the plant's seeds (usually dried), and is extensively used in Ethiopian and Eritrean cuisine. It is an ingredient in berbere, mitmita, awaze, and other spice mixtures, and is also used to flavor coffee.
 Berbere – usually include chili peppers, garlic, ginger, basil, korarima, rue, ajwain or radhuni, nigella, and fenugreek.
 Mitmita – a powdered seasoning mix used in Ethiopian and Eritrean cuisine.

Beverages

 Coffee - A brewed drink made from Ethiopian coffee beans and used in a jebena.
 Tej – A honey wine or mead that is brewed and consumed in Ethiopia and Eritrea.
 Tella – A traditional beer from Ethiopia and Eritrea that is brewed from various grains, typically teff and sorghum. It is called siwa in Tigray and Eritrea.

See also

 Ethiopian cuisine
 Eritrean cuisine
 List of African dishes
 Outline of Ethiopia
 Outline of Eritrea

References

External links
 
 

Lists of foods by nationality
Dishes
Dishes